The London, Tilbury and Southend Railway 51 class was a class of 4-4-2T steam locomotives.  Twelve were built by Sharp, Stewart and Company to the design of Thomas Whitelegg for the London, Tilbury and Southend Railway in 1900, with North British Locomotive Company supplying an additional six in 1903. The LTSR numbered them 51–68, and named them places in London and Essex.

They entered Midland Railway stock in 1912.  The Midland gave them the power classification 2P, and renumbered them 2158–2175. They subsequently entered London, Midland and Scottish Railway stock in 1923. They retained their ex-Midland Railway numbers until 1930 when they were renumbered 2092–2109.

Number 2105 was withdrawn in 1947, and the remaining seventeen of these entered British Railways stock in 1948, and were to be renumbered 41910–41926, but only three (41922, 41923 and 41925) survived to carry their new numbers. The last was withdrawn in 1953.  None was preserved.

List of locomotives

References 
 
 Bob Essery The London, Tilbury and Southend Railway and its Locomotives, OPC (2001) 
 Bob Essery and David Jenkinson An Illustrated History of LMS locomotives. Volume 4. Absorbed Pre-Group Classes Midland Division 

4-4-2T locomotives
51
Sharp Stewart locomotives
NBL locomotives
Railway locomotives introduced in 1900
Standard gauge steam locomotives of Great Britain
Scrapped locomotives